Aldyr Garcia Schlee (Jaguarão (RS), November 22, 1934 – Pelotas (RS), November 15, 2018) was a Brazilian writer, journalist, translator, illustrator and professor.

Biography 
Schlee had two main areas of expertise: Brazilian – Uruguayan international relations and the literature of Uruguay and of Brazil, with further specialty in works produced by authors from the state of Rio Grande do Sul.

He wrote various short stories and his work has been included in a number of anthologies.

Some of his books first appeared in Spanish and were published in Uruguay. Personally fluent to the highest levels both in Portuguese and Spanish, he also grew up with and around his family who spoke German, historically a strong regional language (see Riograndenser Hunsrückisch) and the second most widely spoken language in the state of Rio Grande do Sul.

In 1953 Schlee designed the world-famous Brazil national football team jersey Camisa Canarinho. Schlee died on November 15, 2018, a week before his 84th birthday, and on the eve of a Brazil vs. Uruguay friendly match in London.

Prizes received
Schlee twice received the prestigious Bienal Nestlé de Literatura Brasileira literary prize; and he also granted the Prêmio Açorianos de Literatura prize, five times.

Witness to regional language repression by the State during World War II
In a 2011 interview Schlee said that during World War II he personally witnessed German-Brazilian farmers in a chain gang, arrested because they had been caught speaking their native language when the Brazilian Vargas government had summarily prohibited anyone from speaking it; the author explained how it shocked him and caused a lifelong impression on him, to see those men being paraded single file through the city of Santa Cruz do Sul where he lived at that time.

Bibliography
 2014 "Memórias de o que já não será", Ed ArdoTEmpo
 2013 "Contos da Vida Difícil", Ed ARdoTEmmpo
 2010: "Don Frutos", EdARdoTEmpo
 2009: "Glossário de Simões Lopes Neto" – São Paulo
 2009: "Os limites do impossível – os contos gardelianos" Ed ARdoTEmpo, Porto Alegre.
 2007: "Contos gauchescos e Lendas do Sul", de JSLN, edição crítica com estabelecimento da linguagem. IEL/Unisinos.
 2000: "Contos de Verdades", contos (ed. Mercado Aberto)
 1998: "Linha Divisória" (contos, ed. Melhoramentos)
 1997: "Contos de Futebol" (contos, ed. Mercado Aberto)
 1991: "El dia en que el papa fue a Melo" (contos, ed. de la Banda Oriental) (republished in Portuguese as "O Dia em que o Papa foi a Melo", ed. Mercado Aberto, 1999)
 1984: "Uma Terra Só" (contos, ed. Melhoramentos)
 1983: "Contos de Sempre" (contos, ed. Mercado Aberto)

Anthologies
 2003: "Melhores Contos do Rio Grande do Sul" (contos, ed. IEL)
 1999: "Para Ler os Gaúchos" (contos, ed. Novo Século)
 1996: "Nós os Teuto-gaúchos" (ensaios, ed. da Universidade/UFRGS)
 1994: "Nós os Gaúchos 2" (ensaios, ed. da Universidade/UFRGS)
 1988: "Autores Gaúchos 20: Aldyr Garcia Schlee" (antologia, ed. IEL)
 1977: "Histórias Ordinárias" (contos, ed. Documento)

Translations from Spanish to Portuguese 
 1990 Para Sempre Uruguai (Antologia de contos). Tradução de Sérgio Faraco e Aldyr Garcia Schlee. Porto Alegre: Instituto Estadual do Livro.
 1996 Sarmiento, Domingo Faustino. Facundo: civilização e barbárie no pampa argentino. Tradução, notas e estudo crítico de Aldyr Garcia Schlee. Porto Alegre: Editora da Universidade Federal do Rio Grande do Sul / Editora da Universidade Católica do Rio Grande do Sul. 
 1997 Acevedo Díaz, Eduardo. Pátria Uruguaia. Antologia. Seleção, tradução e notas de Aldyr Garcia Schlee. Porto Alegre: Instituto Estadual do Livro.
 1997 Güiraldes, Ricardo. Don Segundo Sombra. Tradução de Augusto Meyer, revisão da tradução por Aldyr  Garcia Schlee. Porto Alegre: LP&M.

Translations from Portuguese to Spanish
 1991 Lopes Neto, João Simões. La salamanca del Jarau. Porto Alegre:IEL-IGEL.                                                                                        
 2000 Martins, Cyro. Campo afora/Campo afuera. Edição bilíngue português/espanhol. Tradução para o espanhol de Aldyr Garcia Schlee. Porto Alegre, IEL/CELPCYRO.

References

External links
 IstoÉ Gente online

1934 births
2018 deaths
Brazilian people of German descent
Brazilian male short story writers
Brazilian translators
Brazil national football team
People from Jaguarão
Portuguese–Spanish translators
Spanish–Portuguese translators
20th-century Brazilian short story writers
20th-century Brazilian male writers
21st-century Brazilian short story writers
21st-century Brazilian male writers
20th-century translators
Recipients of the Order of Cultural Merit (Brazil)